Phillip Terry (born Frederick Henry Kormann, March 7, 1909 – February 23, 1993) was an American actor.

Early years
Terry was born in San Francisco, California, the only child of German Americans, Frederick Andrew Kormann and Ida Ruth Voll. His father was a chemical engineer in the oil fields who moved often. To ensure he received a stable education, his parents sent him to live with relatives in New Jersey and attend school while they travelled.

He attended grade school in Glendale, California. (A 1945 newspaper item reported that Terry "had elementary education in various schools in the oil country around Texas and Oklahoma.") He attended Iona High School in New York and Sacred Heart College in San Francisco.

During the holidays, he would return to his parents in such places as Oklahoma City, Oklahoma and Burkburnett, Texas. When he completed high school, he rejoined them for good. He worked for a time in the oil fields as a roustabout, then a tool pusher and rig builder. When he was seventeen, they moved back to San Francisco.

He attended Stanford University, ("where he interested himself in theatricals and resolved to become an actor") and where he played football. He then became interested in theatre. After a brief stay in New York, he went to London, in 1933, where he enrolled at the Royal Academy of Dramatic Art.

Career
After studying at the Royal Academy, he toured British provinces for four years performing in stock theater. He went to Hollywood, California and took a job with CBS Radio, where he performed in a number of plays on the air, specializing in Shakespearean roles. In 1937, a Metro-Goldwyn-Mayer talent scout heard him in one of these broadcasts and arranged an interview. Terry made a screen test and was awarded a contract with the studio. Among his motion picture appearances, he had a bit part in the movie Mannequin starring Joan Crawford.

Two years later he signed with Paramount, where he starred in The Parson of Panamint, The Monster and the Girl. He then did supporting roles in Wake Island and Bataan, the work on the latter occurring when he was on "loan-out" to MGM.  During World War II Terry was classified "4F" unfit for military service due to defective vision.

When he left Paramount, he signed with RKO and was in Music in Manhattan, George White's Scandals, Pan-Americana, Born to Kill and the lead in Seven Keys to Baldpate (1947).

Phillip Terry appeared in more than eighty movies over the span of his career. Many of the early roles were small and often uncredited. But in the 1940s, he received bigger and more numerous roles in some quality movies, such as The Lost Weekend (1945) starring Ray Milland, and To Each His Own (1946) starring Olivia de Havilland, who won one of her Oscars for her role in the film.

Investing
 
When his career began to slide in the late 1940s he turned his attention to real estate. He was a good salesman and investor, and eventually became very wealthy.

Marriages
He was married on July 21, 1942, at the Hidden Valley Ranch in Ventura County, California, to film star Joan Crawford. They were divorced in 1946. Irving Wallace, Amy Wallace, David Wallechinsky, and Sylvia Wallace wrote in their book, The Intimate Sex Lives of Famous People:Despite her status as a single parent, in 1939 she [Crawford] began adoption proceedings for a baby girl, whom she named Joan Crawford, Jr. Months later Joan changed the child's name to Christina. ... During [her marriage to Phillip Terry] she adopted a second child — a boy — and named him Phillip Terry, Jr. Following her 1946 divorce from Terry, she renamed the boy Christopher Crawford.

Later years
Terry never completely abandoned acting. During the 1950s, 1960s and early 1970s, he took on occasional movie roles. Some of his better B movies from this period include The Leech Woman (1960), with Grant Williams, and The Navy vs. the Night Monsters (1966), with Mamie Van Doren.

Sometimes he would accept television roles and was in episodes of The Name of the Game and Police Woman. He also made five guest appearances on Perry Mason, including the role of murder victim Robert Doniger in the 1960 episode, "The Case of the Gallant Grafter", and he played murderer Lawrence Kent in the 1961 episode, "The Case of the Resolute Reformer".

Filmography

References

External links

1909 births
1993 deaths
20th-century American male actors
American male radio actors
American male film actors
American male stage actors
American male television actors
Male actors from Glendale, California
20th-century American businesspeople